Poljane pri Mirni Peči is a settlement in the Municipality of Mirna Peč in southeastern Slovenia. The area is part of the historical region of Lower Carniola. The municipality is now included in the Southeast Slovenia Statistical Region.

Name
The name of the settlement was changed from Poljane to Poljane pri Mirni Peči in 1953.

Cultural heritage
A roadside chapel-shrine on the eastern edge of the village dates to 1889.

References

External links
Poljane pri Mirni Peči on Geopedia

Populated places in the Municipality of Mirna Peč